Robert B. Malmo was a Canadian psychologist.

Career
Malmo spent the majority of his academic career at McGill University, Montreal where he worked in the Allan Memorial Institute of Psychiatry.

He was active in the Canadian Psychological Association, of which he became president in 1962.

Publications
 Malmo, H. P. & Malmo, R. B. (1977) Movement-related forebrain and midbrain multiple unit activity in rats. Electroencephalography and Clinical Neurophysiology 42: 501 -09
 Malmo, R. B. (1963) On central and autonomic nervous system mechanisms in conditioning, learning and performance. Canadian Journal of Psychology 17:1-36.
 Malmo, R. B. (1963) Heart rate reactions and locus of stimulation within the septal area of the rat. Science 144:1029-30
 Ross, A. R., & Malmo, R. B. (1979). Cardiovascular responses to rewarding brain stimulation.  Physiology & Behavior, 22, 1005

Positions
 President, Canadian Psychological Association (1962)
 Honorary Life Fellow, Canadian Psychological Association

References

Canadian psychologists
20th-century psychologists
Academic staff of McGill University
Presidents of the Canadian Psychological Association